Hi-Tek is the second studio solo album by rapper, Keak da Sneak and considered to be his best album by fans. It was released on June 16, 2001 by Moe Doe and was produced by Ant Banks, Rick Rock, One Drop Scott, Tone Capone, D-Dre, and Keak da Sneak. The album was a modest success, peaking at #95 on the Top R&B/Hip-Hop Albums, #18 on the Top Independent Albums, and #37 on the Top Heatseekers, and selling 6,510 copies in its first week out.

Track listing
"Intro"- 0:51
"Here Comes Keak da Sneak"- 3:37
"Like What"- 4:12 (Featuring Agerman)
"Tankin, Tinkin, Stinkin"- 4:39 (Featuring E-40)
"Somebody Gotta Pimp It (Somebody Gotta Pimp Her)"- 3:55 (Featuring Too Short)
"Ichi Blop! Blop!"- 4:47
"Gifted"- 4:05
"Skit"- 0:45
"Moe Doe"- 3:11
"Take Me Away"- 5:25
"Pussy"- 4:03 (Featuring B.A.)
"Drank, Weed, Sex"- 3:40 (Featuring Ant Banks)
"P.M."- 5:26
"Hi-Tek II"- 3:54
"Beat It Up"- 4:36
"No Hair Weaves"- 4:11 (Featuring Ant Banks)
"That Way"- 5:14
"Blop Shit"- 4:39

References

2001 albums
Keak da Sneak albums
Albums produced by Rick Rock
Albums produced by Ant Banks